The CONCACAF Gold Cup is North America's major tournament in senior men's football and determines the continental champion. Until 1989, the tournament was known as CONCACAF Championship. It is currently held every two years. From 1996 to 2005, nations from other confederations have regularly joined the tournament as invitees. In earlier editions, the continental championship was held in different countries, but since the inception of the Gold Cup in 1991, the United States are constant hosts or co-hosts.

From 1973 to 1989, the tournament doubled as the confederation's World Cup qualification. CONCACAF's representative team at the FIFA Confederations Cup was decided by a play-off between the winners of the last two tournament editions in 2015 via the CONCACAF Cup, but was then discontinued along with the Confederations Cup.

Since the inaugural tournament in 1963, the Gold Cup was held 25 times and has been won by seven different nations, most often by Mexico (11 titles).

Honduras have won the title once, in 1981, at one of their two home tournaments. They had already been hosts in 1967, where they finished in third place.

Ranking fourth on the all-time table, they are one of the most successful teams in the North American Federation. From 2005 to 2013, they reached the Semi-Finals on four out of five occasions, although they never reached the final during that time. In 1991, Honduras played their only true final, which they lost to the United States after the eighth turn of a penalty shoot-out. Before 1991, the tournament was contested in groups rather than knock-out matches.

Overall record

Match overview

Record by opponent

1981 CONCACAF Championship

At their home tournament in 1981, Honduras started off with three victories over Haiti, Cuba and Canada. The other matches also went in favour of the hosts: Title holder Mexico lost 0–1 to El Salvador, El Salvador lost 0–1 to Canada, and Canada in turn only drew against both Mexico and Haiti. The table situation allowed Honduras to secure the title on the fourth of five match days, by drawing 0–0 against El Salvador.

The last match against Mexico challenged Honduras to stay unbeaten. It was also a chance to showcase their football to the region, which largely would have favoured a Mexican triumph. The match plan was to prioritize defense, which led to few chances on both sides. They succeeded in staying unbeaten by drawing 0–0, eliminating Mexico from the World Cup qualifiers in the process.

Final table

Honduras and El Salvador qualified for the 1982 FIFA World Cup.

Squad

The following players were active members of the champion squad:

Head coach:  Chelato Uclés

Individual records

The following Honduran players have won individual awards at CONCACAF Championships/Gold Cups:

Roberto Figueroa: 1985 Top Scorer (5 goals)
Wilmer Velásquez: 2005 (Shared) Top Scorer (3 goals)
Carlos Pavón: 2007 Top Scorer (5 goals)
Noel Valladares: 2011 Best Goalkeeper

References

Countries at the CONCACAF Gold Cup
Honduras national football team